Joan S. Gomberg (born 1957) is a research geophysicist at the United States Geological Survey. She serves as an adjunct professor at the University of Washington. She is interested in subduction zone science, and studies how earthquakes trigger each other and how faults can slip. Gomberg is a Fellow of the American Geophysical Union. She was the first person to demonstrate how dynamic stress associated with seismic waves can trigger other earthquakes.

Early life and education 
Gomberg studied geophysics at Massachusetts Institute of Technology and graduated with a bachelor's degree in 1979. She moved to California for her graduate studies, earning a PhD in 1989. Gomberg held postdoctoral fellowships at University of California, San Diego and University of Nevada, Reno. She was awarded a Gilbert Fellowship in 1993.

Research and career 
Gomberg joined the United States Geological Survey in 1988. She completed visiting research projects in New Zealand and Italy. At the United States Geological Survey, Gomberg has worked in Colorado, Memphis, and Seattle. In Memphis Gomberg worked on intraplate earthquakes. When she moved to Seattle, which is on a subduction zones. She specialises in earthquake seismology for the Earthquake Hazards Program in the Pacific Northwest. She uses 1-hertz Global Positioning System to monitor seismic waves, as well as high frequency GPS to study ground motion. Gomberg demonstrated that earthquake aftershock are triggered by dynamic stress. She showed that dynamic stresses do not permanently change the applied load, but trigger earthquakes by changing the mechanical state of a fault zone. Faults that have been weakened by dynamic stresses can fail during seismic activity and trigger further earthquakes. In 2001, Gomberg wrote about the impact of the internet on communicating disaster and coordinating emergency response. It is well known that fast fault slips can trigger earthquakes, but Gomberg identified that slow, aseismic fault motion can also cause earthquakes. Gomberg studies the geological action beneath subduction zones, including submarine landslides. Her work has identified that earthquakes may start as foreshocks with aseismic slip.

Gomberg used state-of-the art characterisation methods to contribute to the first seismic hazard maps for Memphis, Tennessee, incorporating the effect of local geology, including soils.

Gomberg is a member of the faculty at the University of Washington, and a member of the Southern California Earthquake Center.

Awards and honors 
 2013 American Geophysical Union Fellow
 2015 Association for Women Geoscientists Excellence Award

Gomberg has won several United States Geological Survey Awards, including leadership awards (1998, 2000, 2001, 2004, 2007, 2008, 2016), liaison awards (1999) and participation awards (2016).

References 

Women geophysicists
American women geologists
1957 births
United States Geological Survey personnel
Massachusetts Institute of Technology School of Science alumni
University of California, San Diego alumni
University of Washington faculty
Living people
American women academics
21st-century American women